Buturlinovka is a town in Voronezh Oblast, Russia, on the Ossered River, a tributary of the Don. It serves as the administrative center of Buturlinovsky District. Its population as of 2021 was 24,397.

History
It was founded in 1740. Town status was granted to it in 1917. Its population has shrunk throughout the past 30 years, as per the Russian census: .

Administrative and municipal status
Within the framework of administrative divisions, Buturlinovka serves as the administrative center of Buturlinovsky District. As an administrative division, it is, together with three rural localities in Buturlinovsky District, incorporated within Buturlinovsky District as Buturlinovskoye Urban Settlement. As a municipal division, this administrative unit also has urban settlement status and is a part of Buturlinovsky Municipal District.

Military

References

Notes

Sources

External links
Official website of Buturlinovka 
Buturlinovka Business Directory 
Mojgorod.ru. Entry on Buturlinovka 

Cities and towns in Voronezh Oblast
Bobrovsky Uyezd